The second 2009 edition of the UNAF U-17 Tournament took place in December 2009, with Morocco as the host of the tournament.

Participants

 (withdrew)

Tournament

Champions

References

2009 in African football
2009
2009
2009–10 in Algerian football
2009–10 in Tunisian football
2009–10 in Moroccan football